Uljas Salomon Kandolin (originally Niskanen, 19 May 1915 − 27 December 1980) was a Finnish actor. During his career, he appeared in several films, usually playing a thug. He also had a long theatrical career.

Selected filmography
 "Minä elän" (1946)
 Radio tekee murron (1951)
 Radio tulee hulluksi (1952)
 Pekka Puupää (1953)
 Morsiusseppele (1954)
 Villi Pohjola (1955)
 Ei ruumiita makuuhuoneeseen (1959)
 Oksat pois... (1961)
 Natalia (1979)

References

External links 
 

1915 births
1980 deaths
Male actors from Helsinki
People from Uusimaa Province (Grand Duchy of Finland)
Finnish male film actors
20th-century Finnish male actors